Loulou is a 1980 French drama film directed by Maurice Pialat and starring Isabelle Huppert and Gérard Depardieu. For Loulou, Pialat was nominated for the Golden Palm award at the 1980 Cannes Film Festival.

Plot summary
In a disco with her husband André, a cultured man who owns a small advertising agency in which she works, Nelly meets Loulou, who is just out of jail and drunk. She spends the night with him in a hotel. The next day, André orders her out of his spacious apartment, so she moves into a hotel room with Loulou, who she supports as he does not believe in work. When she becomes pregnant, she rents a small apartment for them which Loulou fills with his criminal friends, who one night take her on a burglary. Her well-off brother tries to get her to see sense, but she just wants Loulou and their forthcoming child. When Loulou and his gang take her to Sunday lunch with his mother, there is a frightening confrontation with his psychotic brother-in-law who starts firing a shotgun. Realising at last the impossibility of having the child in such an environment, Nelly has an abortion. Loulou is hurt, but the film ends as it began with the two staggering home drunk.

Cast
Isabelle Huppert as Nelly
Gérard Depardieu as Loulou
Guy Marchand as André
Humbert Balsan as Michel
Bernard Tronczak as Rémy
Christian Boucher as Peirot
Frédérique Cerbonnet as Dominique
Jacqueline Dufranne as Mémère
Willy Safar as Jean-Louis
Agnès Rosier as Cathy
Patricia Coulet as Marité
Jean-Claude Meilland as Jean-Claude, le gars du casse
Patrick Playez as Thomas
Gérald Garnier as Lulu
Catherine De Guirchitch as Marie-Jo
Jean Van Herzeele as René
Patrick Poivey as Philippe
Xavier Saint-Macary as Bernard

References

External links
 
 

1980 films
1980 drama films
Adultery in films
1980s French-language films
Films directed by Maurice Pialat
Films scored by Philippe Sarde
French drama films
French pregnancy films
1980s French films